Techweek may refer to:
 Techweek (conference), a Chicago-based conference and expo for start-up companies
 TechWeek (magazine), a bi-weekly technology magazine
 Tech week or technical week, the week before the opening night of a play